This is a list of Cambodia women Twenty20 International cricketers. A Women's Twenty20 International (WT20I) is an international cricket match between two representative teams. A T20I is played under the rules of Twenty20 cricket. In April 2018, the International Cricket Council (ICC) granted full international status to Twenty20 women's matches played between member sides from 1 July 2018 onwards. Cambodia women played their first WT20I on 21 December 2022 against the Philippines during a series against Philippines in Phnom Penh.

The list is arranged in the order in which each player won her first Twenty20 cap. Where more than one player won her first Twenty20 cap in the same match, those players are listed alphabetically by surname.

Key

Players
Statistics are correct as of 12 February 2023.

Note: Details of catchers for the series against Philippines in December 2022 are missing from the Cricinfo scorecard and hence the statistics.

References

Cambodia